Luis Enrique Rueda Otero Born: Socorro, Santander on August 18, 1910 - Died: Montería, Córdoba on July 5, 1974 was a dentist, today regarded as the “Father of Dentistry” in the State of Cordoba, Colombia. A renowned Colombian Dentist, Politician, Community Organizer, athlete, artist and philanthropist, Dr. Rueda-Otero obtained his DDS degree from the Facultad Dental de Cartagena in 1932 (this institution, now closed, had no connection with the University of Cartagena).

Career and accomplishments

In his practice, Dr. Rueda met the dental needs of the people of Lorica, Cerete, San Pelayo, San Carlos, Garzones among all other southern and middles regions of the Sinú River. He stood out as a renowned endodontist, periodontist, and oral rehabilitation surgeon. He was an excellent violinist and a lover of music. Dr. Rueda was also a committed sportsman who encouraged the development of organized sports.  Eight years after his death, Club de Golf Jaraguay in Monteria, Cordoba, honored Dr. Rueda with a national amateur golf tournament under his name. The Copa Luis Enrique Rueda Otero is the most celebrated sporting events in the state (departamento) of Cordoba and one of the most important amateur tournaments of golf in the southern Atlantic coast of Colombia.

In 1939, he was councilman of Monteria and he was part of the board that sought to create the state (departamento) of Sinu (1939) and later the state (departamento) of Cordoba (1951). He also aided in the presidential campaigns of Eduardo Santos, Carlos Lleras Restrepo and Alfonso López Pumarejo.

In 1958, he founded ASOCOR (Odontological Association of Cordoba), for which he was its only president. In 2001 he was honored with the title of the father of Dentistry and Odontology in the state (departamento) of Cordoba in Colombia.

Personal life

On April 3, 1932, he married Dominga Lacharme Altamiranda in Monteria with whom he had six children: Leoni Beatriz Rueda Lacharme, Esther Rueda Lacharme, Maria Eugenia Rueda Lacharme, Luis Enrique Rueda Lacharme, Francisco Rueda Lacharme, Gustavo Rueda Lacharme.

In the 1950s he separated from his first wife and lived in common law marriage at his estate near Monteria with his second partner Neda Minerva Gloria Escobar who he could never marry due to the lack of separation between church and state in Colombia during that era. With Neda Minerva he had three children: Luis Enrique Rueda Gloria, Judith Lucila Rueda Gloria, Pedro Elias Rueda Gloria and later adopted Regina Victoria Rueda Gloria in 1966.

References

 Castro Núñez, Jaime. Historia de la odontología en Córdoba. Ediciones de la Universidad del Sinú, serie científica. Montería, 2001.
http://www.quimica.es/enciclopedia/Luis_Enrique_Rueda.html
http://aprendeenlinea.udea.edu.co/revistas/index.php/odont/article/viewFile/2468/2013

1910 births
1974 deaths
Colombian dentists
20th-century dentists